The 1996 Jacksonville Jaguars season was the franchise's 2nd season in the National Football League and the 2nd under head coach Tom Coughlin.  The Jaguars improved on their 4–12 record from their inaugural season. The Jaguars marked success as they won six of their last seven games of the season and finished with a record of 9–7. The credit for this midseason turnaround probably lies in the demotion of wide receiver Andre Rison in favor of Jimmy Smith after a game against the St. Louis Rams in which Brunell threw 5 interceptions. The interceptions were blamed on Rison and he was benched. In the team’s final game of the regular season against the Atlanta Falcons, needing a win to earn a playoff berth, the Jaguars caught a bit of luck when Morten Andersen missed a 30-yard field goal with less than a minute remaining that would have given the Falcons the lead. The Jaguars clinched the fifth seed in the AFC playoffs.

The Jaguars achieved their first ever franchise playoff game victory, in a stunning upset on the road against the Buffalo Bills. The victory against the Bills was notable due to the fact that the Bills roster was made up of many of the same players that had been to four Super Bowls in the decade, including eventual Hall of Fame players Jim Kelly, Thurman Thomas, Andre Reed, and Bruce Smith (who had previously been the league Defensive Player of the Year). Their next game was on the road against the Denver Broncos, who had dominated the AFC with a 13–3 record (and earned the top AFC seed). The upstart Jaguars were not intimidated by the Broncos or their fans and their good fortune continued, as they largely dominated from the second quarter on. A late touchdown pass from Mark Brunell to Jimmy Smith gave the Jags a 30–20 lead. They held on to win in a huge upset, 30–27, in a game that many people still consider the franchise’s finest hour. Upon their return home, the Jags were greeted by an estimated 40,000 fans at the stadium. Many of these fans had watched the game on the stadium JumboTron displays and had stayed into the early hours of the morning when the team arrived. In the AFC Championship Game, the Jaguars acquitted themselves very well, playing a tight and close defensive game in a hostile environment for over three quarters before finally losing 20–6 to the New England Patriots on the road.

Offseason

NFL draft

Personnel

Staff

Roster

Regular season

Schedule

Note: Intra-division opponents are in bold text.

Standings

Postseason

Schedule

Game summaries

AFC Wild Card Playoffs: vs (4) Buffalo Bills

AFC Divisional Playoffs: vs (1) Denver Broncos

Considered one of the greatest upsets in NFL playoff history, the Jaguars (who were 14 point underdogs, and initially fell behind 12–0 in the first quarter, but led 13–12 at halftime) would stun the Broncos 30–27. Earlier in the day, Denver Post sports columnist Woody Paige referred to the Jaguars as the “Jagwads”, stating throughout the article that the Jaguars weren’t worthy to travel to Mile High Stadium and play the Broncos. The Broncos had indeed been dominant during the regular season, going 13–3. The Broncos opted to rest most of their starters for the better part of the final month of the season- as they had secured the number one seed in the AFC Playoffs relatively early on in the regular season. Conversely, the Jaguars had battled their way into a Wild Card spot; and coming off of their upset road victory in Buffalo, were only further motivated by the general lack of faith in their chances. Mark Brunell threw 245 yards with no interceptions, and two touchdowns, including a diving effort on 3rd down by WR Jimmy Smith with 3:49 left in the fourth quarter to put Jacksonville up 30–20. It was Natrone Means, however that was the star of the game. He ran for 140 yards on 21 carries and a touchdown, and subsequently relieved the pressure on Brunell and the Jaguars passing game. The Broncos would struggle all game to contain Means, whose longest run of the day was 21 yards. With this win, the Jaguars would go to the AFC Championship Game in just the second year of their existence.

AFC Championship: vs (2) New England Patriots

Awards and records
 Mark Brunell, franchise record, most passing yards in one game, 432 yards (Sept 22, 1996)
 Mark Brunell, franchise record, most passing yards in one season, 4,367 yards
 Mark Brunell, led NFL passing yards, 4,367 yards
 Mark Brunell, Pro Bowl MVP Award
 Mike Hollis, franchise record, most field goals in one game, 5 field goals (December 1, 1996)
 Keenan McCardell, franchise record, most receptions in one game, 16 receptions (Oct 20, 1996)

Milestones
 Keenan McCardell, 1,000 yard receiving season (1,129 yards)
 Jimmy Smith, 1,000 yard receiving season (1,244 yards)

References

 Jaguars on Pro Football Reference
 Jaguars Schedule on jt-sw.com

Jacksonville Jaguars
Jacksonville Jaguars seasons
Jacksonville Jaguars season